The Port-au-Prince International Jazz Festival, also known as PAPJAZZ, is a large annual jazz festival held in Haiti, that features many well-known international jazz musicians, and emphasizes its insistence on true jazz, avoiding other forms of popular music. The event is held at various venues for eight nights. It is one of the largest festivals in the world, yielding thousands of visitors per year.

The first year was 2007. In 2013 it featured Branford Marsalis as a headliner, with their first show in the coastal town of Jacmel. That year featured two dozen other jazz musicians from countries such as Mexico, Brazil, Spain, and Cameroon. According to Billboard, "The festival seeks to promote jazz in Haiti, increase understanding between the Haitian and American cultures, and encourage tourism."

See also

List of music festivals
List of jazz festivals

References

External links
Official Website

Haitian music
Jazz festivals in Haiti
Music festivals in Haiti
Summer festivals
Music festivals established in 2007
2007 establishments in Haiti
Events in Port-au-Prince